Slammiversary XVI was a professional wrestling pay-per-view (PPV) event produced by Impact Wrestling. The event took place on July 22, 2018, at The Rebel Complex in Toronto, Ontario, Canada. It was the fourteenth event under the Slammiversary chronology.

Eight professional wrestling matches were contested at the event and were broadcast live on pay-per-view. The main event saw Impact World Champion Austin Aries successfully defended his title against Moose. The undercard also featured acclaimed matches such The Latin American Xchange retaining the Impact World Tag Team Championship by defeating The OGz in a 5150 Street Fight, and Pentagón Jr. defeating Sami Callihan in a Mask vs. Hair match. The event received universal acclaim from fans and critics.

Storylines 

The event featured professional wrestling matches that involved different wrestlers from pre-existing scripted feuds and storylines. Wrestlers portrayed villains, heroes, or less distinguishable characters in the scripted events that built tension and culminated in a wrestling match or series of matches.

At Redemption, Impact Wrestling announced the date for Slammiversary XVI. At the June 4 Slammiversary press conference, two title matches were announced for the event.

Event 

The pay-per-view opened with Fenix, Johnny Impact, Petey Williams and Taiji Ishimori in a Fatal 4-way match. Impact performed a Starship Pain on Fenix to win the match. Rich Swann was scheduled to participate in this match, but due to a concussion that he suffered during a match in MLW, he was replaced by Williams.

Next, Allie faced Tessa Blanchard. In the end, Blanchard performed a hammerlock DDT on Allie to win the match.

After that, Eddie Edwards faced Tommy Dreamer in a House of Hardcore rules match. Edwards won after he performed a Boston Knee Party on a chair into Dreamer's face. After the match, Dreamer offer Edwards his hand. Edwards' accepted the handshake after his wife, Alisha Edwards, arrived at ringside. Dreamer gave a kendo stick to Edwards. Alisha Edwards and Dreamer left, while Edwards stayed in the ring.

Later, Matt Sydal defended the Impact X Division Championship against Brian Cage. He failed to do so, as Cage performed a Drill Claw on Sydal to win the title.

In the fifth match, Su Yung defended the Impact Knockout Championship against Madison Rayne. Yung applied the Mandible Claw until Rayne fainted to retain the title. After the match, Yung put Rayne inside a coffin.

Next, The Latin American Xchange (Santana and Ortiz) accompanied by Konnan defended the Impact World Tag Team Championship against The OGz (Hernandez and Homicide), who were accompanied by King, in a 5150 Street Fight. Santana performed a Frog Splash on Homicide who were laying on thumbtacks to retain the title.

After that, Pentagon Jr. defeated Sami Callihan in a Mask vs. Hair match, when Pentagon performed a package piledriver to win the match. After the match, Pentagon shaved Callihan's hair with a razor on the ramp, while Fenix held Callihan's arms.

In the main event, Austin Aries defended the Impact World Championship against Moose. Toronto Blue Jays outfielder Curtis Granderson served referee's duties for the pre-match (where the championship belt is displayed by the referee before the start) events. Aries performed a brainbuster to retain the title.

Reception 
Slammiversary received widespread critical acclaim. Nolan Howell of Slam Wrestling declared that "Impact Wrestling made a statement here with what could be the best show of the year, at least in American wrestling". Howell's best-rated match was the Impact World Tag Team Championship match at 4.5 out of 5 stars, noting that "it really captured some of the old LAX feel, with great brawling and hardcore spots that really took the blood feud atmosphere up a notch". He rated the main event 4.25 stars out of 5, noting that it "was going to be hard for this to top the rest of the card, but it delivered and then some with Aries continuing his run as one of the top heels in the game. Moose delivered on his end as well with some great big man offense and demonstrating an ability to go beyond that with his bumping."

Mike McMahon of the Pro Wrestling Torch Newsletter rated the Mask vs. Hair match 4.75 stars, describing the match as "very hardcore", and that "it's different from anything else you'll see on a mainstream wrestling level in the U.S." He declared the match as one of his "favorite matches all year so far, across any promotion". He rated the four-way match 4.5 stars, noting that Johnny Impact is "a guy that, if booked the right way, Impact can build around". He also rated the Impact World Tag Team Championship match 4.5 stars, while noting that while he's "OK with just one hardcore match on a show", both Edwards-Dreamer and LAX-OGz "had culminated and called for a more aggressive match". He also observed that the two matches were different, as "LAX vs. OGz was a lot more athletic with more big moves, while Dreamer and Edwards relied on more weapons".

The writer of the Slammiversary report on 411 Mania, Larry Csonka, rated the event an 8.5 out of 10 which was higher than last year's event that was given 7.2 out of 10. Csonka stated that Slammiversary "was a rather great show with a lot of great wrestling to love, and a PPV show that felt, for the first time in a long time, they really gave the talent a chance to go out, do their thing and succeed. This was a tremendously enjoyable show, with nothing at all BAD, and the roster stepping up big time and simply delivering. It's amazing that when you allow the talent to really do their thing and have a hot crowd that good things happen."

Jason Powell from Pro Wrestling Dot Net praised the event as being a "very good effort from Impact Wrestling". He felt that the opening match was "the type of crazy and fun four-way one would expect from these guys", the Impact World Tag Team Championship match as a "crazy brawl that the broadcast team and production had a hard time keeping up with". Powell praised the Mask vs. Hair match, while noting that it "was really good for what it was, but it would have been terrific in the culmination of a long blood feud". Of the Impact World Championship match, Powell said that it was a "good main event with hard work from both men and a crowd that surprisingly didn't lose much momentum despite the Pentagon vs. Callihan semi main event being so insane".

Results

See also

2018 in professional wrestling
Professional wrestling in Canada
List of Impact Wrestling pay-per-view events

References

External links
Impactwrestling.com

Slammiversary
2018 Impact Wrestling pay-per-view events
Professional wrestling in Toronto
2018 in Toronto
Events in Toronto
July 2018 events in Canada